Jessica Robinson may refer to:

Jessica Robinson (country singer), Canadian country music singer
Jessica Robinson (performer), English actress and contestant on reality TV show Over the Rainbow
Jessica Robinson, contestant on Rock Star: INXS
Jessica Robinson, first million dollar winner of the U.S. version of Deal or No Deal